Janus kinase and microtubule interacting protein 3 is a protein that in humans is encoded by the JAKMIP3 gene.

References

Further reading